Jalan Subang–Batu Tiga or Persiaran Jubli Perak, and Jalan Subang, (Federal route ) (formerly Selangor state route B9), is a major highway in Klang Valley region, Selangor, Malaysia.

List of interchanges

Main route

References 

Highways in Malaysia